Dennis Patkin Altman (born 16 August 1943) is an Australian academic and gay rights activist.

Early childhood 
Altman was born in Sydney, New South Wales to Jewish immigrant parents, and spent most of his childhood in Hobart, Tasmania.

Education 
In 1964 he won a Fulbright scholarship to Cornell University, where he began working with American gay activists.

Professions and awards 
Returning to Australia in 1969, he taught politics at the University of Sydney. Later in 1985, Altman moved to La Trobe University, where he later became a professor of politics. He was appointed the Visiting Chair of Australian Studies at Harvard University in January 2005. Since 2009 Altman has been the director of the Institute for Human Security at La Trobe University.

Altman supports organizations that are dedicated to creating a better life for homosexuals, serving on the Australian National Council on AIDS and other international organizations including the AIDS Society of Asia and the Pacific, of which (as of the 2005 Kobe ICAAP Congress) he is president. In October 2006 he was elected to the board of Oxfam Australia. In 2010 he stepped down from this position.

Altman is a longtime patron of the Australian Lesbian and Gay Archives. He has been deeply involved with government and community responses to HIV/AIDS in Australia and the Asia Pacific. He has written in the Mind of America (1986)  and Power and Community (1994), regarding the topics of HIV and AIDS.

Altman is a professorial fellow in the Institute for Human Security at La Trobe University. He was president of the AIDS Society of Asia and the Pacific (2001–2005), and has been a member of the governing council of the International AIDS Society. In 2005 he was visiting professor of Australian studies at Harvard. In July 2006, he was listed by The Bulletin as one of the 100 most influential Australians ever.

In June 2008, he was appointed a Member of the Order of Australia.

At the APCOM HERO Awards 2021, he was awarded the Shivananda Khan Award for Extraordinary Achievement.

Writings and speeches 
In 1971, Altman published his first book, Homosexual: Oppression and Liberation – considered an important intellectual contribution to the ideas that shaped gay liberation movements in the English-speaking world. Among his ideas were "the polymorphous whole" and his posing of the notion of "the end of the homosexual", in which the potential for both heterosexual and homosexual behavior becomes a widespread cultural and psychological phenomenon. In 2005 he published Gore Vidal's America, a study of US author Gore Vidal's writings on history, politics, sex, and religion (Vidal, 2005).

Altman has delivered speeches on the topic of sexual liberation. One of his most notable speeches was delivered during the first Gay Liberation Group meeting at the University of Sydney on 19 January 1972. It was called 'Human beings can be much more than they have allowed themselves to be'.

In 1997 Altman wrote an essay, "Global gaze/global gays", in which he proposes that there are cultural connections between homosexuals in different countries and there is a nascent global gay culture.

In his preface to The City and the Pillar, Gore Vidal writes that Altman brought the book back with him but it was seized at Sydney Airport and subsequently declared obscene by a judge who observed that the Australian obscenity law was "absurd", thus leading to it being repealed sometime later.

In March 2013 Altman wrote about the death of his partner of 22 years, Anthony Smith, who died from lung cancer in November 2012.

Publications

References

External links
 The Australian Lesbian and Gay Archives holds a small collection of personal papers donated by Dennis Altman.
Professor Dennis Altman, La Trobe University staff page
Institute for Human Security List of opinion pieces by Professor Altman and present appointment at La Trobe
What Kevin Rudd should tell the Pope  Opinion piece by Dennis Altman on the La Trobe University website
The Olympic spirit? It's a simple, shared global experience  Opinion piece by Dennis Altman on the La Trobe University website
US Election 2008: Knife-edge race now favours McCain  Opinion piece by Dennis Altman on the La Trobe University website
An excerpt from Altman's book Global Sex
 "Life after Anthony", Sydney Morning Herald, 9 March 2013.

1943 births
21st-century Australian LGBT people
Australian Jews
Cornell University alumni
Gay academics
Harvard University faculty
Gay Jews
Australian LGBT rights activists
Australian gay writers
Academic staff of La Trobe University
Living people
Fulbright alumni